Maxwell Chimezie Egwuatu (born 20 August 1991) is a Nigerian footballer who last played for Al-Seeb Club in the Oman First Division League.

Club career

Youth career
Born and raised in Lagos, Nigeria, Maxwell began his footballing career in 2006 with a local club, Lad-One FC and worked on his footballing skills for a span of two years.

Julius Berger
Maxwell began his professional footballing career in 2008 with his hometown, Lagos-based side, Julius Berger FC (now knows as Bridge FC).

Mambas Noirs
A year later, he again moved out of Nigeria and this time to the neighboring country of Benin where he signed a one-year contract with Benin Premier League side, Mambas Noirs FC. He also had a short stint on loan at the AS Dragons FC de l'Ouémé in 2011.

Costuleni
He first moved out to the Europe in 2011 to Moldova where he signed a three-year contract with Costuleni, Ungheni-based, FC Costuleni. He made his Moldovan National Division on 22 October 2011 in a 1-0 loss against FC Academia Chișinău and scored his first goal on 27 April 2012 in a 1-0 win over FC Rapid Ghidighici. He scored 3 goals in 13 appearances in the 2011–12 Moldovan National Division.

He made his first appearance in the 2012–13 Moldovan National Division on 13 July 2012 in a 5-0 loss against FC Sheriff Tiraspol and scored his first goal on 24 November 2012 in a 1-1 draw against FC Tiraspol. He scored 9 goals in 27 appearances in the 2012–13 season of the Moldovan National Division.

In the 2013–14 Moldovan National Division, he made his first appearance on 27 July 2013 in a 2-1 loss against FC Rapid Ghidighici and scored his first goal on 3 August 2013 in a 2-1 loss against FC Speranța Crihana Veche. With 6 goals in 13 appearances he was adjudged the club top scorer for the 2013-14 season.

Budaiya
In 2015, he moved out to the Middle East and more accurately to Bahrain where he signed a one-year contract with Bahraini Second Division League side, Budaiya Club. He scored 9 goal in 13 appearances in the 2015-16 Bahraini Second Division League and also 5 goals in 5 appearances in the cup competitions of the country, thus becoming the club top scorer for the season.

Club career statistics

References

External links
Maxwell Chimezie Egwuatu - EuroSport
Maxwell Chimezie Egwuatu - SOCCER PUNTER
Maxwell Chimezie Egwuatu - YouTube
Maxwell Chimezie Egwuatu - YouTube

1991 births
Living people
Residents of Lagos
Nigerian footballers
Nigerian expatriate footballers
Association football forwards
Expatriate footballers in Benin
Nigerian expatriate sportspeople in Benin
Expatriate footballers in Moldova
Nigerian expatriate sportspeople in Moldova
Expatriate footballers in Bahrain
Nigerian expatriate sportspeople in Bahrain
Mambas Noirs FC players